Andi Kyriacou (born 4 January 1983) is an English-born, Irish-qualified former rugby union player and current coach. Kyriacou played as a hooker for Sale Sharks, Leeds Carnegie, Saracens, Munster, Ulster, and Cardiff Blues before moving into coaching.

Personal life
Kyriacou was born 4 January 1983 in Liverpool, England. He is of Irish and Greek Cypriot heritage. Kyriacou is married to Rebecca and has three children.

Playing career

Early playing career
Andi Kyriacou started his rugby playing at Ormskirk RUFC and later moved to West Park RFC in St Helens, Merseyside, where he was amongst a string of Lancashire representatives from the club. From here, Kyriacou represented England at u16 and u18.

Sale Sharks 2001–2004
Kyriacou's first senior season in top flight English rugby at Sale Sharks included a debut in the Zurich Premiership.

More recognition came at an international level in 2004, when Kyriacou was part of the England U21 Grand Slam winning side in the U21 Six Nations championship.

Saracens and Munster 2004–2009
Kyriacou joined Saracens on 1 July 2004, one of a number of players to make the move from Sale to Saracens in that season including Alex Sanderson, Iain Fullarton and Kevin Yates, as well as Matt Cairns who was returning to the club after a single season with the Sharks. He made his debut in European competition against Rugby Parma on 4 December of that year, with his Guinness Premiership debut soon after 2005–06 .

Working alongside Matt Cairns, Fabio Ongaro and Shane Byrne, Kyriacou was selected by Declan Kidney to join Munster Rugby for the 2006–07 season, making multiple appearances for the club in both their Celtic League and Heineken Cup campaigns. The playing experience drawn from Munster Rugby meant that the 2007–08 season presented greater opportunities for Kyriacou back with Saracens, ready for their 2007/8 European Cup campaign.

Ulster Rugby 2009–2012
In July 2009, Kyriacou signed a contract with Ulster Rugby. Whilst at Ulster, Kyriacou was selected for the Ireland squad and was capped for the Ireland Wolfhounds.

Injury and retirement 
Kyriacou joined Cardiff Blues for the 2012–13 Pro 12, but his playing career was cut short by a back injury early in the season.

Coaching career
Cardiff Blues then signed Kyriacou in a coaching role, supervising the scrum and skills in the first instance, later moving on to coach the forwards. In 2015, Kyriacou went on to become the forwards coach for Russia Rugby, alongside working as the scrum coach for his original club Sale Sharks. Kyriacou was signed by Nottingham Rugby as Defence and Forwards Coach at the beginning of the 2018/19 season, where he built one of the most successful defensive systems and strongest packs in The Championship.

Ahead of the 2021–22 season, Kyriacou joined Irish province Munster's academy as a forwards coach. Kyriacou had spent time on loan with the province during his playing career. Kyriacou was promoted to forwards coach with Munster's senior squad on a two-year contract from the 2022–23 season, with previous forwards coach Graham Rowntree being promoted to head coach.

References

External links
Saracens profile
Saracens Signing Announcement
Guinness Premiership profile
Magners League profile
Munster Profile

1983 births
Living people
English rugby union players
Sale Sharks players
Leeds Tykes players
Saracens F.C. players
Munster Rugby players
Ulster Rugby players
Cardiff Rugby players
Rugby union hookers
English people of Irish descent
British people of Greek Cypriot descent
Irish people of Greek Cypriot descent
Irish people of Greek descent
Lancashire County RFU players
Irish Exiles rugby union players
Munster Rugby non-playing staff
Rugby union players from Liverpool
English expatriate sportspeople in Ireland
Expatriate rugby union players in Ireland
English expatriate rugby union players
English rugby union coaches
Citizens of Ireland through descent